A 2+2 road is a specific type of dual-carriageway that exists primarily in Ireland, Sweden, Estonia and Finland, consisting of two lanes in each direction separated by a steel cable barrier.

These roads do not have hard shoulders and therefore cannot be designated as motorways in the future. However, they may be designated as limited-access roads, as such roads do not require the physical standard of motorways to be designated as expressways. The Irish variant has  lanes where there are a number of Swedish variants some with  lanes.

Junctions are generally at-grade roundabouts and minor roads cross under or over the mainline without connecting. They are also known as "type 2 dual-carriageways" by the Irish National Roads Authority. These roads look similar to expressways, except that expressways often have interchanges, large medians or concrete barriers between traffic.

History

First Irish 2+2
In Ireland first purpose-built road of this type opened in December 2007 as a new greenfield section of the N4 national primary route which joins Dublin to Sligo.

See also
 2+1 road
 Limited-access road

References

Road surface markings
Ireland
Roads in Sweden
Types of roads